Seven Thieves is a 1960 American film noir heist crime drama film shot in CinemaScope. It stars Edward G. Robinson, Rod Steiger, Joan Collins and Eli Wallach.

Directed by Henry Hathaway and produced by Sydney Boehm, it was adapted for the screen by Sydney Boehm, based on the 1959 novel The Lions At The Kill by Max Catto. Technical advisor was Candy Barr, who, as choreographer, taught dance routines to Collins.

Seven Thieves received an Academy Award nomination for Best Costume Design Black-and-White (Bill Thomas).

Plot
A discredited expatriate American professor, Theo Wilkins, has called on a young protégé and sophisticated thief, Paul Mason, to come over from the US to the south of France and help him pull off one final heist. He has masterminded a caper to steal $4,000,000 in French francs from the underground vault of the casino of Monte Carlo, Monaco. Wilkins has recruited a team of thieves – including Melanie, an exotic dancer – but he needs someone he can trust, Mason, to keep them all in line during the crime.

The heist takes place on the night of a grand celebration at the casino. Melanie's protector, the saxophone player Pancho, and Wilkins enter the casino in the guises of (respectively) "Baron von Roelitz," an aristocrat with a disability who uses a wheelchair, and his physician, "Dr. Vidal." At the same time, Melanie, the safecracker Louis and Mason attend the party with invitations procured by the gang's inside man at the casino, the meek assistant to the director, Le May, who is under Melanie's spell.

Mason and Louis go out of a window, which Melanie shuts behind them, and make their way along a narrow ledge high above the sea to the casino director's office. From there, they descend by elevator to the vault four floors below. They cut through a barred gate in front of the vault and drill through the lock, secure the cash and make their way back to the director's elevator.

Pancho's part of the plan is to ingest a cyanide capsule to simulate a heart attack. Afraid, he fails to do so, necessitating that Wilkins inject him with cyanide instead. Pancho collapses and Wilkins maneuvers the casino director, in the name of "discretion," into transporting "the baron" to his office. Here, Wilkins pretends to phone for an ambulance, and informs the director that the baron is dead.  They leave the office with the inert baron in it.

Immediately re-entering the director's office, Louis and Mason stash the money in the hollow seat of the baron's wheelchair.  They then return along the ledge to the window into the casino, which Melanie has reopened for them, narrowly avoiding being caught by casino security. Louis and Melanie depart the party together, while Mason makes his way out separately.

The "ambulance" summoned by Wilkins is in reality part of the plan, and is driven by the last accomplice, Fritz. Pancho is strapped into the wheelchair, taken to the side entrance of the casino and loaded into the ambulance. The conspirators then make their getaway.  Just as Pancho is regaining consciousness in the back of the ambulance, Wilkins, smiling in the excitement of his success, peacefully and unexpectedly dies.  Mason and Melanie drive him back to his hotel. While driving back to the hideout, Mason breaks down and Melanie realizes that Wilkins was his father.

Mason and Melanie decide they want no part of the stolen money. They return to the hideout, where the others are squabbling over how to split the take. Mason examines the money and discovers that it is brand new currency and that all the serial numbers are on file with the Bank of France, which will make it next to impossible to spend. Mason and Melanie, realizing that the others will be unable to resist spending the cash, will be caught and will implicate them, forcibly take the cash away and return it to the casino. Ironically, while returning the money they hit it big on the roulette table.  Thus the two of them, who by now have decided to take their chances in life together, emerge as the only members of the gang to come out ahead.

Cast
 Edward G. Robinson – Professor Theo Wilkins
 Rod Steiger – Paul Mason
 Joan Collins – Melanie
 Eli Wallach – Pancho
 Alexander Scourby – Raymond Le May
 Michael Dante – Louis Antonizzi
 Berry Kroeger – Hugo Baumer aka Fritz
 Sebastian Cabot – Director of Casino

References

External links
 
 
 
 

Film noir
1960 films
1960 crime drama films
1960s heist films
American heist films
American neo-noir films
Films based on British novels
Films set in Monaco
Films directed by Henry Hathaway
20th Century Fox films
1960s American films